Dr. Azahari bin Husin (14 September 1957 – 9 November 2005), also Azahari Husin, Azhari Husin, was a Malaysian who was believed to be the technical mastermind behind the Philippine consulate bombing in Jakarta, Jakarta Stock Exchange bombing, Christmas Eve 2000 Indonesia bombings, 2002 Bali bombings, 2002 Makassar bombing, 2004 Poso bus bombing and 2005 Tentena market bombings. He was killed in a police raid on his hideout in Indonesia in 2005. He was nicknamed the "Demolition Man".

History
He received extensive bomb training in Afghanistan. He authored the JI bomb manual, used in the Philippine consulate bombing in Jakarta, Jakarta Stock Exchange bombing, the Christmas Eve bombing, the Bali bombing, and the 2003 Marriott Hotel bombing. He also planned the 2004 Jakarta embassy bombing and was implicated in the 2002 Makassar bombing, the 2004 Poso bus bombing, the 2005 Tentena market bombings and the 2005 Bali bombings. Prior to his death, he was one of the most wanted men in Indonesia along with Noordin Mohammad Top.

In July 2004, Husin and Noordin narrowly escaped a police raid on a rented house west of Jakarta, where forensic experts later found traces of explosives used in the embassy bombing. Neighbours described both as reclusive men who left the property only to pray at a nearby mosque; and they said that before the bombing, they saw the duo loading heavy boxes into a white delivery van which is the same type used in that attack. 

Before the Marriott Hotel bombing, Husin is known to have stayed with Asmar Latin Sani, the suspected Marriott suicide bomber, at his home in Bengkulu on the island of Sumatra.

Both men were close associates of Jemaah Islamiyah's former operational chief, Riduan Isamuddin (better known as Hambali), who was captured in Thailand in 2003.

Death
On November 9, 2005, Indonesian police, acting on a tip-off, located Husin. They conducted a raid on one of his hideouts in Batu, near Malang in East Java with Detachment 88 operators sent to assist regular police officers. Three suspected jihadist terrorists barricaded themselves inside a house and they put up stiff resistance, throwing grenades and firing bullets at the police outside. This was followed by a series of explosions, one of which was a suicide blast by his assistant setting off his bomb vest. Police identified the intact corpse of Azahari, with a bullet wound in his chest. Husin was shot and killed by a police sniper, after which one of his disciples blew himself up to prevent him from being taken alive.

References

External links
 https://web.archive.org/web/20040730085001/http://www.abc.net.au/4corners/content/2003/20030210_bali_confessions/suspects.htm
 http://www.theage.com.au/articles/2004/09/10/1094789690535.html
 http://news.bbc.co.uk/1/hi/world/asia-pacific/4421300.stm
 https://web.archive.org/web/20110607124514/http://www.hm-treasury.gov.uk/d/fin_sanctions_alqaida_190410.pdf

1957 births
2005 deaths
People from Johor
Malaysian people of Malay descent
Malaysian Muslims
Malaysian Islamists
Malaysian criminals
Jemaah Islamiyah
Alumni of the University of Reading
People shot dead by law enforcement officers in Indonesia